Tiffany Michelle (born June 4, 1984) is an American professional poker player, World Series of Poker gold ring winner and TV presenter, who broke records in the WSOP Main Event as the Last Woman Standing and was named one of the Most Fascinating People in Poker and in Maxims Top 20 Hottest Celebrity Poker Players.

After two years working as a TV presenter/commentator and tournament reporter on the professional poker tour, Michelle played in the $10,000 buy-in World Series of Poker Main Event in 2008, where she was the "Last Woman Standin, placing 17th out of 6,844 players. It was the largest field ever beat by a female in live poker tournament history and earned her a payday of $334,534. A year later she competed as the only all-female team on the Emmy Award–winning 15th season of The Amazing Race, along with best friend and fellow poker pro Maria Ho. The two made up the "poker girls" team and were eliminated three legs shy of the finish line.

In 2010, she had four final table finishes but it was not until 2022 that she finally won her first WSOP gold ring at the World Series of Poker Circuit series in Lake Tahoe, California.

One of few poker personalities to cross over into mainstream media, Michelle has been featured on the covers of Steppin' Out, Ocean View, Rounder, and Casino Player magazines. She has appeared on several television programs, including a series regular role on season 4 of the Emmy-nominated soap opera series DeVanity, portraying villainess Scarlett Kane, and competing on Food Network's Worst Cooks in America LA Ink, where she finished in Bobby Flay's final 3.

As a writer, Michelle's work has been featured as a sports columnist for All In magazine, a lifestyle columnist for Bluff magazine, and an inspirational and relationship columnist for Converge magazine. As an on-camera presenter and television host, she has most recently been seen at the helm of the 2021 World Series of Poker's official media coverage and as co-host of CBS Sports' Poker Night Live (2018).

Career 
Born and raised in Los Angeles County, California, it was while working as an actress that Tiffany got her start in poker, playing Hollywood house games with fellow actors, which included Zachary Levi and Joel David Moore. With a knowledge of poker, coupled with her television background she began booking jobs as an on-camera poker host and commentator.

In 2006, she was heard nationwide on Sirius Satellite Radio as an on-air reporter for Bluff Magazine's live broadcast of the 2006 WSOP. In 2007, she became the first ever female hired as the resident and full-time on-camera host for Pokernews.com,. She traveled the poker circuit internationally providing tournament updates, player interviews and red carpet coverage for poker tournaments and events worldwide, on the European Poker Tour, World Poker Tour, and World Series of Poker tours.

On the heels of her 2008 record-breaking WSOP finish, Michelle made another deep run at the World Poker Tour season 7 Borgata Poker Open Main Event for a $15,000 payday. Over the next few years she continued to put up results in live and online tournaments, including four final tables in 2010 alone.

In 2013, she wrote, produced and starred in the short film Breaking Up and Away – also starring Zack Conroy and CariDee English. In 2014, she was a series-regular (and resident villainess) on the DeVanity. In 2015, she returned to her on-camera poker hosting roots, as a guest host and sideline reporter for the Heartland Poker Tour.

In 2018, she signed on as the Creative Director, and On-Camera Host of The Gardens Casino's 13-week celebrity poker live stream series Gardens Poker Night and, subsequently, appears as a co-host on the CBS Sports televised Poker Night Live celebrity poker program

From 2018–2020 she joined the 888poker tour as their on-camera host and global social media creative director/producer, for most of their live event festivals

In 2021 she resurfaced at the World Series of Poker in the original role that made her famous in the poker industry, as the on-camera presenter for PokerNews, the official media provider for the World Series of Poker.

In 2022, she won her first ever World Series of Poker gold circuit ring in Lake Tahoe Event #14 $400 No-Limit Hold'Em, which came with invite to the 2023 WSOP Tournament of Champions. Less than 24hrs later she made another final table in the closing Event #16 $400 No-Limit Hold'Em Double Stack, finishing in 7th place.

Acting 
Tiffany began acting in theatrical productions at the age of ten. She performed in several productions at the Lancaster Performing Arts Center, with roles in musical adaptations of Pinocchio, Beauty and The Beast, Cinderella, and played the starring role in Alice in Wonderland. She was recognized by the Missoula Children's Theatre, two years in a row, as one of their "Best Young Performers."

In her adolescence, she competed on the pageant circuit, winning the titles of Miss Teen Newhall (2000), Miss Teen Santa Clarita Valley (2001), and was voted Miss Congeniality at the 2001 Miss Teenage California pageant, where she was a Top 10 finalist.

While studying Theatre and Communications at College of the Canyons in Santa Clarita, CA, Tiffany continued performing in stage plays, as well as spearheaded the school's Speech & Debate Team. As the Speech & Debate team captain she competed, primarily, in Individual Events and won trophies nationally for her Dramatic Interpretation and Prose Interpretation performances. After two-years with the C.O.C. theatre program, then studying with UCLA's Film & Television Department, she embarked on a film and television career, booking roles on ER, Guilty or Innocent, Family Affair (2002 remake) and American Dreams.

One of Michelle's biggest roles, and most dramatic performances, came in 2005 when she starred opposite One Life to Live's David Fumero in the award winning independent film Carrie's Choice, based on a true story. The following year she landed a lead role in the horror film The Thirst: Blood War, starring Sean Connery's son, Jason Connery. The production was later halted and put on hold until 2008, at which point it was recast.

After a sabbatical from acting (2008–2012), Tiffany Michelle returned to the screen in early 2012 with appearances on Days of Our Lives and a guest-starring role on the award-winning soap opera series, DeVanity. In 2013, she wrote, produced and starred in the short film Breaking Up and Away. In 2014, Michelle return to the fourth and final season of DeVanity, as a series regular. She portrayed the resident villainess, Scarlett (Kane) DeVanity, the TV daughter of acclaimed Dallas actor Steve Kanaly.

Music 
Tiffany Michelle is also a singer/songwriter. She plays piano and guitar and has performed at several legendary Hollywood music venues, including BB Kings, and Hotel Cafe. In 2010, Tiffany headlined a special collaborative music show with guest performances by celebrity music artists and friends, including Maria Ho, American Idol's Chikezie and 90210 actor, Ryan Eggold.

Reality television

The Amazing Race 
In 2009, Michelle was invited to compete on the 15th season of the CBS competition reality show, The Amazing Race. Alongside best friend and fellow poker player, Maria Ho the two made up the season's only all-female team and they traveled to Japan, Vietnam, Cambodia, Dubai, and The Netherlands, exiting the competition in 6th place.

Worst Cooks in America 
In 2012, Tiffany competed as one of 16 contestants on season three of Food Network's Worst Cooks in America. She was picked by chef Bobby Flay to compete as a member of his "Blue team." Tiffany won the Main Dish breakfast challenge in episode one as well as a pizza making Skill Drill in episode three. She made it down to the final three contestants on Bobby Flay's team and was sent home in episode six.

References

External links 

 Official website

1984 births
American poker players
Female poker players
Poker commentators
The Amazing Race (American TV series) contestants
Actresses from Santa Clarita, California
American twins
Actresses from California
Living people
21st-century American actresses
Participants in American reality television series